Staphylococcus piscifermentans is a Gram-positive, coagulase-negative member of the bacterial genus Staphylococcus consisting of clustered cocci.  This species was originally isolated from fermented fish in Thailand. A later study found a strain of S. piscifermentans in dog feces.  The species is used in the preparation of fermented foods along with Staphylococcus carnosus; both species reduce nitrate and produce ammonia.

References

External links
UniProt taxonomy
Type strain of Staphylococcus piscifermentans at BacDive -  the Bacterial Diversity Metadatabase

piscifermentans
Bacteria described in 1992